Mekapati Rajamohan Reddy (born 11 June 1944) is a former member of the 9th Lok Sabha, 14th Lok Sabha, 15th Lok Sabha, 16th Lok Sabha of India. He represented the Nellore Loksabha Constituency in Andhra Pradesh and is a member of the YSR Congress. He was the YSR Congress Lok Sabha Floor leader in 16th Lok Sabha.

Reddy lost an election contest in 1983 as an Indian National Congress (INC) candidate. In 1985 he was elected to the Andhra Pradesh Legislative Assembly as a candidate of the same party, and in 1989 he became an INC member of the Lok Sabha. He stood again for parliament in 1996, 1998 as MP candidate from Ongole parliamentary constituency, both times as a Telugu Desam Party candidate. Those attempts were unsuccessful and in 2004 from Narasaraopet parliamentary constituency and in 2009 elections from Nellore parliamentary constituency as INC candidate, winning on both occasions. Reddy then became a member of the YSR Congress and was re-elected to the 15th Lok Sabha in a by-election.
He was elected as Leader in Lok Sabha from YSRCP Party.

Politics

 1985 -- Member of Andhra Pradesh Legislative Assembly Udayagiri.
 1989 -- Member of 9th Lok Sabha from Ongole.
 2004 -- Member of 14th Lok Sabha from Narasaraopet.
 2009 -- Member of 15th Lok Sabha from Nellore.
 2011  -- Member of 15th Lok Sabha from Nellore from YSR Congress.
 2014  -- Member of 16th Lok Sabha from Nellore and Lok Sabha YSR Congress floor leader.

References

1944 births
Living people
India MPs 2004–2009
India MPs 2009–2014
Telugu politicians
Andhra Pradesh MLAs 1985–1989
Telugu Desam Party politicians
Indian National Congress politicians from Andhra Pradesh
YSR Congress Party politicians
India MPs 1989–1991
Lok Sabha members from Andhra Pradesh
India MPs 2014–2019
People from Nellore